Mayport is an unincorporated community in Clarion County, Pennsylvania, United States. Mayport has a post office with ZIP code 16240.

Notes

Unincorporated communities in Clarion County, Pennsylvania
Unincorporated communities in Pennsylvania